Hogan's Alley is a tactical training facility of more than  operated by the FBI Training Academy.  Hogan's Alley was opened in 1987, and was designed to provide a realistic urban setting for training agents of the FBI, DEA, and other local, state, federal and international law enforcement agents.  It is also occasionally used as an urban combat training venue for lieutenants at the United States Marine Corps' The Basic School, which is located nearby. The term "Hogan's Alley" is also used generically to refer to any shooting range devoted to tactical training.

Description
Hogan's Alley consists of a street with a bank, a post office, a hotel ("The Dogwood Inn"), a laundromat, a barber shop, a pool hall, homes, shops, and more, many of which are named after events in the FBI's past.  The town is populated by actors who role play parts appropriate to the training that is in progress; most play innocent bystanders, but some play terrorists, bank robbers, drug dealers, or other criminal roles.  One of the buildings really houses a classroom for training agents on site and another building houses a working FBI office used in some simulated scenarios.

Hogan's Alley is used to teach agents investigative techniques, firearms skills, and defensive tactics.  Scenarios involve investigations of terrorist activities, planning and making arrests, processing evidence at crime scenes, conducting interviews and searches, using ballistic shields as protection, and clearing areas and buildings so they're safe to enter.  Realistic paintball bullets, known as Simunition, which are fired from realistic paintball guns, are used in simulated gun fights with the criminal role players.

History
The FBI's Hogan's Alley has evolved out of established police and military training facilities dating back to the period between World War I and World War II.  The first reference to a facility called "Hogan's Alley" was at the Special Police School, established by the National Rifle Association and the Army's National Board for the Promotion of Rifle Practice at Camp Perry in Ohio.  The facility was established after a 1920 survey of police departments for cities with a population over 25,000 revealed that only 13 had established marksmanship training programs.  In 1924, the police departments of all cities with populations of over 10,000 were invited to participate in national matches at Camp Perry.

The coming of WWII closed the Special Police School down, but the principle of Hogan's Alley lived on in other forms, such as the "House of Horrors" kill house described by Rex Applegate in his book "Kill or be Killed".  The setup used for training OSS agents was quite a bit different from the modern Hogan's Alley, since lack of simulated munitions meant that training with live targets was not possible.  The OSS agents trained using pop-up targets and reduced caliber, .22 Long Rifle pistols to minimize the danger and the damage to the facility, but it was still live ammunition and potentially lethal.  Instructors followed students through the house by holding onto their belts, so that contact was always maintained in the darkened corridors.

Since civilian law enforcement's rules of engagement are far more restrictive than those generally in effect in the military, the FBI's Hogan's Alley relies on simulated munitions and role playing to make the shoot/no-shoot decisions far more realistic than was possible in the past.  Modern simulations used by military and police also now include a wide range of simulated weapons and scenarios, from force on force scenarios using paintball gun technology to life sized, computer animated simulations projected in special 360 degree theaters, using advanced light guns with force feedback to simulate recoil.

Origin of name
According to the FBI, they "borrowed it from the Hogan's Alley comic strip of the 1890s. The alley was located in a rough neighborhood, so we thought the name fit our crime-ridden town."  While the comic strip was almost certainly the original source of the name, the Camp Perry facility was probably the more immediate source of the name.  The Camp Perry facility re-opened in 1956, and was probably used by the FBI, and that was probably the inspiration for the 1984 arcade game Hogan's Alley.

See also
 Hogan's Alley, a 1984 arcade game and later Nintendo light gun game that simulates a live fire shooting range with pop-up shoot/no-shoot targets.

External links
Hogan's Alley @ fbi.gov
Article, "NRA & law enforcement: Ties that bind" American Rifleman,  Aug 1995.
Article, "PERRY'S 26TH YEAR SALUTED ON RANGES; Colonel Critchfield, Founder of Camp, Celebrates by Bossing Fire at His "Running Deer." POLICE VICTORS EMERGE St. Louisan Wins "Hogan's Alley" Shoot--Robert Hughes Takes First Honors Among Juniors. Colonel Critchfield on Job at 67. Veteran's Gossip of Old Days. Varied Costumes of Motley Throng. Winner of "Hogan's Alley" Battle. Turtles Assist in Alibis. Juniors Receive Their Awards. High Honors for Robert Hughes. Police Prizes Bestowed" by HANSON W. BALDWIN, New York Times Aug 30, 1931. pg. 16

Federal Bureau of Investigation